Buffalo Springs (also Ayan bito) is an unincorporated community in McKinley County, New Mexico, United States.

Notes

Unincorporated communities in McKinley County, New Mexico
Unincorporated communities in New Mexico